Squirrel Scouts may refer to:

 Squirrel Scouts (The Scout Association), the youngest, and newest, age section of The Scout Association in the United Kingdom, for children four to six years old
Northern Ireland Squirrel Association a predecessor to the UK-wide Squirrel Scout section
 Squirrel Scouts, an environmental education program at Nature Center at Shaker Lakes, Ohio
 Individual members of squirrel colonies who seek out new habitats
 Squirrel/Scout helicopters, interchangeable terms for small helicopters
 Fictional youth organizations
 The Squirrel Club, an analog of Scouts from Hey Duggee
 Squirrel Scouts, an analog for Girl Scouts, based in the Acorn Flats summer camp in the Camp Lazlo tv show
 Squirrel Scouts, a youth group featured in an episode of Little Lulu
 Squirrel Scouts and Seaweed Masks, an season 2 episode of Tyler Perry's Young Dylan
 Squirrelly Scouts, a youth group that Fairly OddParents''' Timmy Turner is a member of
 Squirrel Camp and Squirrel Scouts, from The Kids from Room 402''